The 1962 VFL Grand Final was an Australian rules football game contested between the Essendon Football Club and Carlton Football Club, held at the Melbourne Cricket Ground in Melbourne on 29 September 1962. It was the 65th annual Grand Final of the Victorian Football League, staged to determine the premiers for the 1962 VFL season. The match, attended by 98,385 spectators, was won by Essendon by a margin of 32 points, marking that club's 11th premiership victory.

Teams

Umpire – Jack Irving

Scoreboard

Statistics

Goalkickers

Attendance
 MCG crowd – 98,385

References
AFL Tables: 1962 Grand Final
 The Official statistical history of the AFL 2004 
 Ross, J. (ed), 100 Years of Australian Football 1897-1996: The Complete Story of the AFL, All the Big Stories, All the Great Pictures, All the Champions, Every AFL Season Reported, Viking, (Ringwood), 1996.

See also
 1962 VFL season

VFL/AFL Grand Finals
Grand
Essendon Football Club
Carlton Football Club
September 1962 sports events in Australia